Lazzate is a comune (municipality) in the Province of Monza and Brianza in the Italian region Lombardy, located about  northwest of Milan.

Lazzate borders the following municipalities: Bregnano, Cermenate, Lentate sul Seveso, Rovellasca, Misinto.

References

External links
 Official website